80,000 Suspects is a 1963 British drama film directed by Val Guest and starring Claire Bloom, Richard Johnson, Yolande Donlan, and Cyril Cusack. It concerns an outbreak of smallpox in Bath, England.

Plot
Commencing on New Year's Eve in the city of Bath, Dr. Steven Monks (Richard Johnson) diagnoses a mystery patient as being infected with smallpox and sets in motion a citywide quarantine to contain the outbreak. His commitment to the task is affected by the deterioration of his marriage to ex-nurse Julie (Claire Bloom) following his clandestine affair with a family friend.

Monks receives an unexpected blow when the disease strikes closer to home than anticipated and Julie is diagnosed as having contracted the virus. The medical team gradually contains the outbreak until only one unidentified case remains.

The search narrows the identity of final carrier down to Ruth Preston (Yolande Donlan), the woman with whom Monks had been having an affair and the wife of his close colleague Clifford (Michael Goodliffe). She's eventually traced to a deserted hotel where she's sheltering, lonely and desperately ill.

Cast
Claire Bloom as Julie Monks
Richard Johnson as Steven Monks 
Yolande Donlan as Ruth Preston 
Cyril Cusack as Father Maguire 
Michael Goodliffe as Clifford Preston 
Mervyn Johns as Buckridge 
Kay Walsh as Matron 
Norman Bird as Harold Davis
Vanda Godsell as Agnes Davis 
Basil Dignam as Medical Officer 
Arthur Christiansen as Editor 
Ray Barrett as Bennett 
Andrew Crawford as Dr. Ruddling 
Jill Curzon as Nurse Jill 
Ursula Howells as Joanna Druten
Basil Dignam as Medical Officer Boswell
Arthur Christiansen as Mr Gracey
Ray Barrett as Health Inspector Bennett
David Weston as Brian Davis (uncredited)
Pauline Barker as Clara (uncredited)
Joby Blanshard as Health Inspector Matthews (uncredited)
Felix Bowness as Wellford (uncredited)
Olwen Brookes as Senior Nursing Officer (uncredited)
Victor Brooks as Health Inspector Collins (uncredited)
Gerald Case as Chief Administration Officer (uncredited)
Norman Chappell as Welford (uncredited)
Rachel Clay as Jane Davis (uncredited)
H. Leonard Coggins as Waiter (uncredited)
Richard Coleman as Scott James (uncredited)
Maureen Crombie as Auxiliary Nurse (uncredited)
Monti DeLyle as Night Porter (uncredited)
Marian Diamond as Sister Durrell (uncredited)
Suzan Farmer as Carole (uncredited)
Leonie Forbes as Nurse Vicky (uncredited)
Stewart Guidotti as Sidney Davis (uncredited)
Alan Keith as Health Inspector Sanders (uncredited)
Bruce Lewis as himself - TV Reporter (uncredited)
Peter Madden as Ambulance Driver (uncredited)
Terry Martin as Guildhall Sergeant (uncredited)
Carmel McSharry as Cleaner (uncredited)
John Merivale as Mr Bradley (uncredited)
Graham Moffatt as Fat Man in Vaccination Queue (uncredited)
Bruce Montague as Brooks (uncredited)
Ian Parsons as Health Inspector (uncredited)
Lisa Peake as Nurse Lisa (uncredited)
David Rose as Health Inspector (uncredited)
Guy Thomas as himself - Newsreader (uncredited)
Kim Tracy as Daphne Davis (uncredited) 
Russell Waters as Town Clerk of Bath (uncredited)
Joseph Wise as Deputy Health Minister (uncredited)
Anthony Flagg as Telegraph Engineer (uncredited)

External links 
 
 British Movie Directors  Retrieved 2010-03-11.
 Original Clip from film  Retrieved 2010-03-11.
 Opening scenes Clip from film  Retrieved 2010-03-11.
 
 Val Guest - Obituary, 15 May 2006 - The Independent  Retrieved 2010-03-12.

1963 films
British drama films
Films directed by Val Guest
Films set in Bath, Somerset
1963 drama films
1960s English-language films
1960s British films